Henry Morton may refer to:

 H. V. Morton (Henry Vollam Morton, 1892–1979), British journalist and travel writer
 Henry Morton (politician) (1867–1932), Australian politician
 Henry Morton (scientist) (1836–1902), American scientist
 Henry Thorne Morton (1888–1966), New Zealand politician
 Henry Edgar Morton (1872–1952), Australian civil engineer, town planner and public servant
 Henry Morton, a character in Walter Scott's novel Old Mortality